The Hostarius (alternatively, Usher, Doorward or Durward) was an office in medieval Scotland whose holders, eventually hereditary, had the theoretical responsibility of being warden of the king's door: protecting the king's property. This is a list of hostarii.

 Malcolm de Molle, uncle of Alan fitz Walter, 2nd High Steward of Scotland
 Jocelin, reign of William the Lion
 Thomas de Lundin (son of Máel Coluim son of Gille Críst, Earl of Mar), d. 1231
 Alan Durward (son of Thomas), d. 1275

The family of "Durward" (a later name for hostarius) may have held the office hereditarily after Thomas of Lundie, and certainly kept the title as a surname (in Norman French, l'Ussier ("the Usher"); in English, Durward) The office was no longer hereditary by the second half of the 13th century, and indeed, by then, there were many hostarii. Unlike many other hereditary royal office holders, the "Durward" family were not of Anglo-Norman or French origin but native Gaelic origin. It was a sept of the native comital dynasty of Mar.

References

Notes

Sources
Balfour Paul, Sir James, Scots Peerage'''IX vols. Edinburgh 1904.
 Hammond, Matthew H., "The Durward family in the thirteenth century", in Steve Boardman and Alasdair Ross (eds.), The Exercise of Power in Medieval Scotland, c.1200–1500'', (Dublin/Portland, 2003). pp. 118–37

See also
 Clann-an-oistir
 Ostiarius

Scotland in the High Middle Ages